Lyudmila Vasiliyevna Rogachova (born 30 October 1966 in Lad Balka) is a retired Russian middle-distance runner who competed mainly in the 1500 metres. She became a World Indoor and European champion in this event, and won an Olympic silver medal in 1992 with a personal best time of 3:56.91 - beating future world record holder Qu Yunxia into bronze. Her 800 metres PB was 1:56.82.

International competitions

References

1966 births
Living people
Soviet female middle-distance runners
Russian female middle-distance runners
Olympic female middle-distance runners
Olympic athletes of Russia
Olympic athletes of the Unified Team
Olympic silver medalists for the Unified Team
Olympic silver medalists in athletics (track and field)
Athletes (track and field) at the 1992 Summer Olympics
Athletes (track and field) at the 1996 Summer Olympics
Athletes (track and field) at the 2000 Summer Olympics
Medalists at the 1992 Summer Olympics
Universiade medalists in athletics (track and field)
Universiade bronze medalists for the Soviet Union
Medalists at the 1989 Summer Universiade
Goodwill Games medalists in athletics
Competitors at the 1994 Goodwill Games
World Athletics Championships athletes for the Soviet Union
World Athletics Championships medalists
World Athletics Indoor Championships winners
European Athletics Championships medalists
Russian Athletics Championships winners
Japan Championships in Athletics winners
Sportspeople from Stavropol Krai